An axe ( sometimes ax in American English; see spelling differences) is an implement that has been used for millennia to shape, split and cut wood, to harvest timber, as a weapon, and as a ceremonial or heraldic symbol. The axe has many forms and specialised uses but generally consists of an axe head with a handle, or helve.

Before the modern axe, the stone-age hand axe without a handle was used from 1.5 million years BP. Hafted axes (those with a handle) date only from 6000 BC.  The earliest examples of handled axes have heads of stone with some form of wooden handle attached (hafted) in a method to suit the available materials and use. Axes made of copper, bronze, iron and steel appeared as these technologies developed.

The axe is an example of a simple machine, as it is a type of wedge, or dual inclined plane. This reduces the effort needed by the wood chopper. It splits the wood into two parts by the pressure concentration at the blade. The handle of the axe also acts as a lever allowing the user to increase the force at the cutting edge—not using the full length of the handle is known as choking the axe. For fine chopping using a side axe this sometimes is a positive effect, but for felling with a double bitted axe it reduces efficiency.

Generally, cutting axes have a shallow wedge angle, whereas splitting axes have a deeper angle. Most axes are double bevelled (i.e. symmetrical about the axis of the blade), but some specialist broadaxes have a single bevel blade, and usually an offset handle that allows them to be used for finishing work without putting the user's knuckles at risk of injury. Less common today, they were once an integral part of a joiner and carpenter's tool kit, not just a tool for use in forestry. A tool of similar origin is the billhook.

Most modern axes have steel heads and wooden handles, typically hickory in the US and ash in Europe and Asia, although plastic or fibreglass handles are also common. Modern axes are specialised by use, size and form. Hafted axes with short handles designed for use with one hand are often called hand axes but the term hand axe refers to axes without handles as well. Hatchets tend to be small hafted axes often with a hammer on the back side (the poll). As easy-to-make weapons, axes have frequently been used in combat, and is one of humanity's oldest melee weapons.

History

Hand axes, of stone, and used without handles (hafts) were the first axes. They had knapped (chipped) cutting edges of flint or other stone. Early examples of hand axes date back to 1.6 mya in the later Oldowan, in Southern Ethiopia around 1.4 mya, and in 1.2 mya deposits in Olduvai Gorge. Stone axes made with ground cutting edges were first developed sometime in the late Pleistocene in Australia, where grind-edge axe fragments from sites in Arnhem Land date back at least 44,000 years; grind-edge axes were later present in Japan some time around 38,000 BP, and are known from several Upper Palaeolithic sites on the islands of Honshu and Kyushu. 
Hafted axes are first known from the Mesolithic period (c. 6000 BC). Few wooden hafts have been found from this period, but it seems that the axe was normally hafted by wedging. Birch-tar and rawhide lashings were used to fix the blade.

The distribution of stone axes is an important indication of prehistoric trade. Thin sectioning is used to determine the provenance of the stone blades. In Europe, Neolithic "axe factories", where thousands of ground stone axes were roughed out, are known from many places, such as:

 Great Langdale, England (tuff)
 Rathlin Island, Ireland (porcellanite)
 Krzemionki, Poland (flint)
 Neolithic flint mines of Spiennes, Belgium (flint)
 Plancher-les-Mines, France (pelite)
 Aosta Valley, Italy (omphacite).

metal axes are still produced and in use today in parts of Papua, Indonesia. The Mount Hagen area of Papua New Guinea was an important production centre.

From the late Neolithic/Chalcolithic onwards, axes were made of copper or copper mixed with arsenic. These axes were flat and hafted much like their stone predecessors. Axes continued to be made in this manner with the introduction of Bronze metallurgy. Eventually the hafting method changed and the flat axe developed into the "flanged axe", then palstaves, and later winged and socketed axes.

Symbolism, ritual, and folklore

At least since the late Neolithic, elaborate axes (battle-axes, T-axes, etc.) had a religious significance and probably indicated the exalted status of their owner. Certain types almost never show traces of wear; deposits of unshafted axe blades from the middle Neolithic (such as at the Somerset Levels in Britain) may have been gifts to the deities.

In Minoan Crete, the double axe (labrys) had a special significance, used by priestesses in religious ceremonies.

In 1998 a labrys, complete with an elaborately embellished haft, was found at Cham-Eslen, Canton of Zug, Switzerland. The haft was 120 cm long and wrapped in ornamented birch-bark. The axe blade is 17.4 cm long and made of antigorite, mined in the Gotthard-area. The haft goes through a biconical drilled hole and is fastened by wedges of antler and by birch-tar. It belongs to the early Cortaillod culture.

The coat of arms of Norway feature a lion bearing an axe, which is represent the King Olaf II of Norway, who was honored as the Eternal King of Norway.

In folklore, stone axes were sometimes believed to be thunderbolts and were used to guard buildings against lightning, as it was believed (mythically) that lightning never struck the same place twice. This has caused some skewing of axe distributions.

Steel axes were important in superstition as well. A thrown axe could keep off a hailstorm, sometimes an axe was placed in the crops, with the cutting edge to the skies to protect the harvest against bad weather. An upright axe buried under the sill of a house would keep off witches, while an axe under the bed would assure male offspring.

Basques, Australians and New Zealanders have developed variants of rural sports that perpetuate the traditions of log cutting with axe. The Basque variants, splitting horizontally or vertically disposed logs, are generically called aizkolaritza (from aizkora: axe).

In Yorùbá mythology, the oshe (double-headed axe) symbolises Shango, Orisha (god) of thunder and lightning. It is said to represent swift and balanced justice. Shango altars often contain a carved figure of a woman holding a gift to the god with a double-bladed axe sticking up from her head.

The Hurrian and Hittite weather god Teshub is depicted on a bas-relief at Ivriz wielding a thunderbolt and an axe.

The Arkalochori Axe is a bronze, Minoan, axe from the second millennium BC thought to be used for religious purposes. Inscriptions on this axe have been compared with other ancient writing systems.

Parts of the axe

The axe has two primary components: the axe head, and the haft.

Axe head

The axe head is typically bounded by the bit (or blade) at one end, and the poll (or butt) at the other, though some designs feature two bits opposite each other. The top corner of the bit where the cutting edge begins is called the toe, and the bottom corner is known as the heel. Either side of the head is called the cheek, which is sometimes supplemented by lugs where the head meets the haft, and the hole where the haft is mounted is called the eye. The part of the bit that descends below the rest of the axe-head is called the beard, and a bearded axe is an antiquated axe head with an exaggerated beard that can sometimes extend the cutting edge twice the height of the rest of the head.

Axe haft

The axe haft is sometimes called the handle. Traditionally, it was made of a resilient hardwood like hickory or ash, but modern axes often have hafts made of durable synthetic materials. Antique axes and their modern reproductions, like the tomahawk, often had a simple, straight haft with a circular cross-section that wedged onto the axe-head without the aid of wedges or pins. Modern hafts are curved for better grip and to aid in the swinging motion, and are mounted securely to the head. The shoulder is where the head mounts onto the haft, and this is either a long oval or rectangular cross-section of the haft that is secured to the axe head with small metal or wooden wedges. The belly of the haft is the longest part, where it bows in gently, and the throat is where it curves sharply down to the short grip, just before the end of the haft, which is known as the knob.

Types of axes

Axes designed to cut or shape wood

 Felling axe: Cuts across the grain of wood, as in the felling of trees; in single or double bit (the bit is the cutting edge of the head) forms and many different weights, shapes, handle types and cutting geometries to match the characteristics of the material being cut. More so than with for instance a splitting axe, the bit of a felling axe needs to be very sharp, to be able to efficiently cut the fibres.
 Splitting axe: Used in wood splitting to split with the grain of the wood. Splitting axe bits are more wedge shaped. This shape causes the axe to rend the fibres of the wood apart, without having to cut through them.
 Broad axe: Used with the grain of the wood in precision splitting or "hewing" (i.e. the squaring-off of round timbers usually for use in construction). Broad axe bits are most commonly chisel-shaped (i.e. one flat and one beveled edge) facilitating more controlled work as the flat cheek passes along the squared timber.
 Adze: A variation featuring a head perpendicular to that of an axe. Rather than splitting wood side-by-side, it is used to rip a level surface into a horizontal piece of wood. It can also be used as a pickaxe for breaking up rocks and clay.
 Hatchet: A small, light axe designed for use in one hand specifically while camping or travelling.
 Carpenter's axe: A small axe, usually slightly larger than a hatchet, used in traditional woodwork, joinery and log-building. It has a pronounced beard and finger notch to allow a "choked" grip for precise control. The poll is designed for use as a hammer.
 Hand axe: A small axe used for intermediate chopping, similar to hatchets.
 Mortising axe: Used for creating mortises, a process which begins by drilling two holes at the ends of the intended mortise. Then the wood between the holes is removed with the mortising axe. Some forms of the tool have one blade, which may be pushed, swung or struck with a mallet. Others, such as twybil, bisaigüe and piochon have two, one of which is used for separating the fibres, and the other for levering out the waste.

Axes as weapons

 Archer's axe: a one-handed axe with bearded head carried by medieval archers. It served both as melee weapon and tool. Defensively deployed archers in line used the poll of this axe to hammer wooden stakes into the ground and then sharpened the still exposed upper ends of these stakes by chopping them to points with the blade. Lines of such stakes were primarily intended to serve the archers as protective obstacles against cavalry attack.
 Battle axe: In its most common form, an arm-length weapon borne in one or both hands. Compared to a sword swing, it delivers more cleaving power against a smaller target area, making it more effective against armour, due to concentrating more of its weight in the axehead.
 Tomahawk: used almost exclusively by Native Americans, its blade was originally crafted of stone. Along with the familiar war version, which could be fashioned as a throwing weapon, the pipe tomahawk was a ceremonial and diplomatic tool.
 Spontoon tomahawk: A French trapper and Iroquois collaboration, this was an axe with a knife-like stabbing blade instead of the familiar wedged shape.
 Shepherd's axe: used by shepherds in the Carpathian Mountains, it could double as a walking stick.
 Ono: a Japanese weapon wielded by sōhei warrior monks.
 Dagger-axe (Ji or Ge): A variant of Chinese polearmlike weapon with a divided two-part head, composed of the usual straight blade and a scythe-like blade. The straight blade is used to stab or feint, then the foe's body or head may be cut by pulling the scythe-like horizontal blade backwards. Ge has the horizontal blade but sometimes does not have the straight spear.
 Halberd: a spearlike weapon with a hooked poll, effective against mounted cavalry.
 Poleaxe: designed to defeat plate armour. Its axe (or hammer) head is much narrower than other axes, which accounts for its penetrating power.
 Dane axe: A long-handled weapon with a large flat blade, often attributed to the Norsemen.
 Throwing axe: Any of a number of ranged weapons designed to strike with a similar splitting action as their melee counterparts. These are often small in profile and usable with one hand.
 Hurlbat: An entirely metal throwing axe sharpened on every auxiliary end to a point or blade, practically guaranteeing some form of damage against its target.
 Francisca or Frankish axe: a short throwing weapon of the European Migration Period, the name of which may have become attached to the Germanic tribe associated with it: the Franks (see France).
 Parashu: The parashu is an Indian battle-axe. It is generally wielded with two hands but could also be used with only one. It is depicted as the primary weapon of Parashurama, the 6th Avatar of Lord Vishnu in Hinduism.
 Sagaris: An ancient weapon used by Scythians.
 Yue: A Chinese weapon with very large axe blade, also served as ceremonial weapon.

Axes as tools 
 Double bit axe: A common axe in the ancient world; introduced to America in the 1800s. The heavy head makes it ideal for felling trees. Often one bit is designated for tasks that would more quickly dull the edge such as cutting roots through dirt.
 Firefighter's axe, fire axe, or pick head axe: It has a pick-shaped pointed poll (area of the head opposite the cutting edge). It is often decorated in vivid colours to make it easily visible during an emergency. Its primary use is for breaking down doors and windows.
 Crash axe: A short lightweight handheld emergency chopping tool with a sharp or serrated blade spanning a quarter circular from the axis of the handle, sometimes with a notch in the blade to catch on sheet metal, and often a short pick opposite the blade, this tool or a prybar is required to be carried in most large aircraft cockpits with 20 seats or more to quickly chop and pry walls and cabinets to gain access when extinguishing a fire while in flight or to escape when exits are unavailable.  A crash axe is sometimes also used by crash rescue firefighter crews to chop through the airplane's sheet metal skin for a rescue opening; modern crash axes are often made with an electrically insulated handle.
 Ice axe or climbing axe: A number of different styles of ice axes are designed for ice climbing and enlarging steps used by climbers.
 Lathe hammer (also known as a lath hammer, lathing hammer, or lathing hatchet): a tool used for cutting and nailing wood lath which has a small hatchet blade on one side (which features a small lateral nick used for pulling out nails) and a hammer head on the other.
 Mattock: A dual-purpose axe, combining an adze and axe blade, or sometimes a pick and adze blade.
 Pickaxe: An axe with a large pointed end, rather than a flat blade. Sometimes exists as a double-bladed tool with a pick on one side and an axe or adze head on the other. Often used to break up hard material, such as rocks or concrete.
 Pulaski: An axe with a mattock blade built into the rear of the main axe blade, used for digging ('grubbing out') through and around roots as well as chopping.  The pulaski is an indispensable tool used in fighting forest fires, as well as trail-building, brush clearance and similar functions.
 Slater's axe: An axe for cutting roofing slate, with a long point on the poll for punching nail holes, and with the blade offset laterally from the handle to protect the worker's hand from flying slate chips.
 Splitting maul: A splitting implement that has evolved from the simple "wedge" design to more complex designs. Some mauls have a conical "axehead"; compound mauls have swivelling "sub-wedges", among other types; others have a heavy wedge-shaped head, with a sledgehammer face opposite.

Hammer axe
Hammer axes (or axe-hammers) typically feature an extended poll, opposite the blade, shaped and sometimes hardened for use as a hammer. The name axe-hammer is often applied to a characteristic shape of perforated stone axe used in the Neolithic and Bronze Ages. Iron axe-hammers are found in Roman military contexts, e.g. Cramond, Edinburgh, and South Shields, Tyne and Wear.

See also
 Axe manufacturing in Pennsylvania
 Axe murder
 Blade
 Cleaving axe
 Corded Ware culture
 Fasces
 Kaiser blade
 Nzappa zap
 Sagaris

Related forestry terms
 Chainsaw
 Felling
 Firewood
 Hewing
 Limbing
 Log bucking
 Log splitter
 Logging
 Pruning
 Splitting maul
 Woodchopping

References

Further reading
Neolithic axes
 W. Borkowski, Krzemionki mining complex (Warszawa 1995)
 P. Pétrequin, La hache de pierre: carrières vosgiennes et échanges de lames polies pendant le néolithique (5400 – 2100 av. J.-C.) (exposition musées d'Auxerre Musée d'Art et d'Histoire) (Paris, Ed. Errance, 1995).
 R. Bradley/M. Edmonds, Interpreting the axe trade: production and exchange in Neolithic Britain (1993).
 P. Pétrequin/A.M. Pétrequin, Écologie d'un outil: la hache de pierre en Irian Jaya (Indonésie). CNRS Éditions, Mongr. du Centre Rech. Arch. 12 (Paris 1993).

Medieval axes
 Schulze, André(Hrsg.): Mittelalterliche Kampfesweisen. Band 2: Kriegshammer, Schild und Kolben. Mainz am Rhein.: Zabern, 2007. 

Modern axes
 Gottfried Reissinger: Die Konstruktionsgrundlagen der Axt Parey, Hamburg 1959, ISBN 978-3490211163

Superstition
 H. Bächtold-Stäubli, Handwörterbuch des deutschen Aberglaubens (Berlin, De Gruyter 1987).

External links

 Section about types of axes is originally based on a Quicksilver Wiki article at  under the terms of the GNU Free Documentation License.
 

Woodworking hand tools
Timber preparation
Forestry tools
Logging
Axes
Gardening tools
Camping equipment